Ross Gelbspan was a journalist, writer and environmentalist. He has written two books relating to global warming: The Heat Is On (1997) and Boiling Point (2004). The Heat Is On received national attention when President Bill Clinton told the press he was reading it. Boiling Point was the subject of the lead review in the Sunday New York Times Book Review. That review was written by former Vice President Al Gore. Gelbspan maintains the website heatisonline.org, which he updates on a daily basis.

Prior to his involvement in the climate issue, Gelbspan worked as an editor and reporter at a number of newspapers, including The Philadelphia Bulletin, The Washington Post and The Boston Globe. At the Globe, he conceived a project, selected the reporters and edited the articles. The series won a Pulitzer Prize in 1984.  

Since becoming involved in the climate issue, Gelbspan has delivered a number of lectures, radio and television interviews and has published multiple articles on the subject. He is a regular contributor on DeSmogBlog.

He has published op-ed articles in a number of major newspapers—as well as articles in a number of other outlets including Harper's, The Atlantic Monthly, The American Prospect, Sierra Magazine, The Nation, and many others.  He has spoken in venues that include the World Economic Forum and the Boston Social Forum. His media interviews include, among others, appearances on Nightline, All Things Considered, Talk of the Nation, World News Tonight and other outlets.

The Heat Is On
Bill McKibben wrote "Until you've read this book, you're ill-equipped to think about the planet's future." The New York Times Book Review said "No other reporter has told the story as comprehensively or explored its implications for human welfare as searchingly as Gelbspan" (quoted on cover of paperback edition of The Heat Is On).

A major theme of The Heat Is On is the treatment of the climate change issue in the U.S. Congress during the 90's. Chapter 3 is entitled "A Congressional Book Burning." Gelbspan recounts numerous House and Senate hearings where Republican representatives and Senators focused on and endorsed the views of scientists who oppose the mainstream scientific assessment of global warming like Patrick Michaels, S. Fred Singer and Richard Lindzen.

Publications
Boiling Point: How Politicians, Big Oil and Coal, Journalists and Activists Are Fueling the Climate Crisis—And What We Can Do to Avert Disaster, Basic Books, (August 1, 2004) 
 The Heat Is On: The Climate Crisis, the Cover-Up, the Prescription, Perseus Books Group; Updated edition (September 1, 1998) 
 The Washington Post, March 19, 1995, "Should We Fear a Global Plague? Yes – Disease Is the Deadliest Threat of Rising Temperatures"
 Break-Ins, Death Threats and the FBI: The Covert War Against the Central America Movement, South End Press 1991

See also
Climate change policy of the United States

References

External links
The Heat Is Online
 
Extended interview with Ross Gelbspan on Global Warming, Original Broadcast 1/14/07 on WPKN 89.5 FM Duration: Approx. 50 min
Interview with Ross Gelbspan disproving the arguments of "The Great Global warming Swindle" (Audio)

Year of birth missing (living people)
Living people
American male journalists
American non-fiction environmental writers
American political writers
Sustainability advocates